Amlwch is a port town and community in Wales. It is situated on the north coast of the Isle of Anglesey, on the A5025 which connects it to Holyhead and to Menai Bridge. As well as Amlwch town and Amlwch Port, other settlements within the community include Burwen, Porthllechog/Bull Bay and Pentrefelin. The town has a beach in Llaneilian, and it has significant coastal cliffs. Tourism is an important element of the local economy. At one time it was a booming mining town that became the centre of a vast global trade in copper ore. The harbour inlet became a busy port and significant shipbuilding and ship repair centre, as well as an embarkation point with boats sailing to the Isle of Man and to Liverpool. The community covers an area of about 18 square kilometres.

Town Centre
The name Amlwch – a reference to the site of the town's harbour, Porth Amlwch – derives from Welsh am ("about, on or around") and llwch (an old word meaning "inlet, creek" - similar to the Gaelic word "loch" for a body of water).

On 23 November 1981, the first tornado of the record-breaking 1981 United Kingdom tornado outbreak, an F1/T2 tornado, passed through Amlwch.

At the 2011 census the community had a population of 3,789.

It is also home to the local secondary school, Ysgol Syr Thomas Jones which Lemmy attended, and the town also has a primary school.

The local newspaper for northeastern Anglesey is Yr Arwydd ('The Sign'). Yr Arwydd is the local Welsh name for Mynydd Bodafon, the paper covers the area surrounding the mountain, and has an image of the summit as its logo.

Industry
Amlwch grew rapidly in the 18th century near what was then the world's biggest copper mine at the nearby Parys Mountain. By the late 18th century, Amlwch had a population of around 10,000 and was the second largest town in Wales after Merthyr Tydfil. It was at this time that its harbour was also extended to accommodate the ships needed to transport the ore.

When the copper production declined, a wide variety of industrial activities were developed to take its place. Ship-building in the narrow harbour area and other sites around the coast of Amlwch Port was a significant enterprise from the 1820s and grew in significance after the railway opened in 1864, reducing the use of the harbour for copper and other goods by ship. By 1912 the main shipbuilding activities were in decline, and neither the harbour nor shipyards offered much commercial activity.

In the 1970s, Amlwch had an offshore single point mooring - Amlwch Oil Terminal - which was used to receive large oil tankers which were unsuitable for the Mersey. Reception tanks were located ashore and the oil was pumped from there to the refineries on the Manchester Ship Canal. The terminal closed in 1990.

When copper mining began to decline in the mid-1850s, shipbuilding became the main industry with many people also becoming involved in the ship repair and other maritime industries. The town was home to a brewing industry and also had tobacco works, producing the famous Amlwch Shag Tobacco - "Baco Shag Amlwch".

Pubs in the area include the King's Head, the Queen's Head, the Mariner, the Dinorben Arms Hotel and the Market Tavern in the town, and the Liverpool Arms and the Adelphi Vaults down in the port area.

Railway
Amlwch station was the northern terminus of the Anglesey Central Railway which was opened in 1864. It closed to passengers a hundred years later, in 1964, but for the next 30 years was used by freight trains. In 1951 the Amlwch Octel bromide works installed an extension to the line from Amlwch station into their premises. After the passenger service ceased the line continued until 1993 with freight trains bringing sulphuric acid in to the Octel works, and transporting Bromine and related products used in fuel additives,  back to the main line, bound for Ellesmere Port.

In 1993 the freight activity was all transferred to road vehicles, and use of the line ceased. The rails were not lifted however, leaving open the prospect that the line could be restored as a tourist and local transport facility for Amlwch, Llanerchymedd and Llangefni. In 2012 a local enthusiast group, Anglesey Central Railway, or Lein Amlwch, were granted permission to clear and survey the line condition, and in May 2017 the Welsh Government announced that re-opening Llangefni station was under active consideration, raising a strong hope that the service could one day continue north to reach Amlwch again.

Tourism
Attractions in Amlwch include its restored port area, the Anglesey Coastal Path which passes through it, its watch tower containing an exhibition by Geo Môn, maritime and copper mining museums, St Eleth's Church (which dates from 1800) and the reinforced concrete Catholic church Our Lady Star of the Sea and St Winefride, built in 1937.

Governance
Amlwch is in the Twrcelyn electoral ward which also includes Llanbadrig, Llaneilian and Rhosybol, electing three county councillors to the Isle of Anglesey County Council. Prior to the 2012 Anglesey electoral boundary changes the town was represented by two county councillors elected from two wards, Amlwch Port and Amlwch Rural.

Amlwch has a community council, Amlwch Town Council, comprising fifteen community councillors elected from the three community wards of Town, Rural and Amlwch Port.

Sport and Leisure
The town's leisure centre is one of the few on Anglesey and has a swimming pool, sports centre. It is situated on Anglesey's 125-mile stretch of coast that is designated Area of Outstanding Natural Beauty.

The town also has two football clubs, Amlwch Town F.C., who play in the Welsh Alliance League, and Amlwch Port F.C., a Sunday League pub team that plays in the North Wales Sunday League.

Amlwch has a sea rowing club based in Bull Bay, Trireme Ynys Mon Rowing Club.

Notable people

 Billy Butler (born 1942), radio and television presenter
 William Edwards (1938–2007), Labour politician, born in Amlwch 
 Thomas Parry Jones OBE (1935–2013) scientist, inventor and entrepreneur from Carreglefn 
 Lemmy (1945–2015), lead singer and primary songwriter of the rock band Motörhead, attended Ysgol Syr Thomas Jones
 Captain Keith Paul Mills DSC (born 1959), Royal Marines officer who commanded the defence of South Georgia against the Argentines in 1982.
 Edward Parry (ca.1599 – 1650) Church of Ireland Bishop of Killaloe, born in Madyn Dyswy
 William Roos (1808–1878), artist and engraver
 Andy Whitfield (1971–2011), actor, brought up in Bull Bay
 William Williams VC, DSM & Bar (1890–1965), a Welsh recipient of the Victoria Cross

References

External links

 A Vision of Britain Through Time

 
Towns in Anglesey